Macropogon is a genus of soft-bodied plant beetles in the family Artematopodidae. There are at least three described species in Macropogon.

Species
These three species belong to the genus Macropogon:
 Macropogon piceus LeConte, 1861
 Macropogon sequoiae Hopping, 1936
 Macropogon testaceipennis Motschulsky, 1859

References

Further reading

 
 
 

Elateroidea genera
Articles created by Qbugbot